The Nokia 8310 is a mobile phone manufactured by Nokia between 2001 and 2002. Belonging to the 8000 series, the handset was a member of Nokia's flagship premium 'candybar' variety, and retailed for a price in excess of £400 on launch after its announcement at CEBIT in March 2001. Incorporating Nokia's trademark menu system and GUI with a white backlight colour, the device was easy to operate, yet contained advanced premium features not normally found on handsets of the time, such as infrared, a fully functional calendar, and was the first Nokia phone to support GPRS and an FM Radio.

As the successor to the Nokia 8210, the 8310 was even smaller in size, one of the smallest Nokia have produced to date. It also has support for Xpress-On covers, and it was reported to come in 100 colour combinations.

The 8310 shares the same platform and shape with the Nokia 6510, which the successor being a more business-oriented phone and utilised a higher resolution 96x60 display. Faceplates designed for the 8310 can be installed on a 6510 and vice versa.

It was also succeeded by the Nokia 7210 which was released in 2002.

Variants
A GSM-1900 version for the North American market named the Nokia 8390 was also released. AT&T Wireless and Rogers Communications offered the 8390 in the United States and Canada, respectively.

References

8310
Mobile phones with infrared transmitter